Houfton  may refer to:
John Plowright Houfton (1857–1929), British colliery owner and politician from Mansfield in Nottinghamshire
Percy Bond Houfton (died 1926), British architect